Alex J. Kay (8 March 1979 in Kingston upon Hull, England) is a British historian who specialises in Nazi Germany. He has been described as "a leading scholar on the Third Reich and German history" and has become prominent above all as a result of his publications on the Hunger Plan and the genocide of Soviet Jewry.

Education and career 
Kay obtained his PhD in 2005 from the Humboldt University, Berlin, in Modern and Contemporary History with the thesis Neuordnung and Hungerpolitik: The Development and Compatibility of Political and Economic Planning within the Nazi Hierarchy for the Occupation of the Soviet Union, July 1940 – July 1941. In 2006 he was awarded the first George L. Mosse Prize of the prestigious scholarly journal Journal of Contemporary History for his article Germany’s Staatssekretäre, Mass Starvation and the Meeting of 2 May 1941, which is based on an aspect of his doctoral thesis. He was contributing co-editor of the collection of essays Nazi Policy on the Eastern Front, 1941: Total War, Genocide, and Radicalization, which was described in the English Historical Review as "a major work of scholarship".

Historian of Nazi Germany
Kay carried out academic research and wrote panel texts for the travelling exhibition of the Foundation Memorial to the Murdered Jews of Europe "Was damals Recht war..." – Soldaten und Zivilisten vor Gerichten der Wehrmacht ("What the law was then... – Soldiers and civilians before courts of the Wehrmacht), which was opened in June 2007 in Berlin. He planned and organised the travelling exhibition of the Archivberatungsstelle Hessen at the Hessian State Archives in Darmstadt Bestandserhaltung – Schutz des Kulturgutes in den hessischen Kommunalarchiven, which was shown from 15 February to 29 March 2011 in Darmstadt's Haus der Geschichte. From 2006 to 2014, he also worked as an independent contractor for the Ludwig Boltzmann Institute for Research on War Consequences. Kay has published articles in several German newspapers, including the national dailies the Frankfurter Allgemeine Zeitung and the Süddeutsche Zeitung, the Berlin daily Der Tagesspiegel and the national weekly der Freitag, editor-in-chief of which is Jakob Augstein.

From July 2014 to December 2016, Kay was the first Senior Academic Coordinator at the Institute of Contemporary History Munich-Berlin leading the project team preparing the English-language version of the 16-volume source edition The Persecution and Murder of the European Jews by Nazi Germany, 1933–1945 (originally published in German). In 2016, he was elected lifetime Fellow of the Royal Historical Society. He has taught in the Department of History at the University of Potsdam since 2017.

Publications

Books 
 Exploitation, Resettlement, Mass Murder: Political and Economic Planning for German Occupation Policy in the Soviet Union, 1940–1941. Series: Studies on War and Genocide, Vol. 10, Berghahn Books, New York/Oxford 2006 [= Berlin, Humboldt Uni., PhD thesis, 2005 under the title Neuordnung and Hungerpolitik] (paperback edition 2011). .
 Nazi Policy on the Eastern Front, 1941: Total War, Genocide, and Radicalization. (Co-editor with Jeff Rutherford and David Stahel) With a foreword by Christian Streit. Series: Rochester Studies in East and Central Europe, Vol. 9, University of Rochester Press, Rochester, NY 2012 (paperback edition 2014). .
 The Making of an SS Killer: The Life of Colonel Alfred Filbert, 1905–1990. Cambridge University Press, Cambridge 2016 (hardback and paperback editions). .
 The Making of an SS Killer. Das Leben des Obersturmbannführers Alfred Filbert 1905-1990. Ferdinand Schöningh, Paderborn 2017. .
 Mass Violence in Nazi-Occupied Europe. (Co-editor with David Stahel) Indiana University Press, Bloomington, IN 2018 (hardback and paperback editions). .

Peer-reviewed articles and book chapters (selection) 
 Germany’s Staatssekretäre, Mass Starvation and the Meeting of 2 May 1941. In: Journal of Contemporary History. Vol. 41, 2006, No. 4, pp. 685–700 (awarded the George L. Mosse Prize 2006).
 Revisiting the Meeting of the Staatssekretäre on 2 May 1941: A Response to Klaus Jochen Arnold and Gert C. Lübbers. In: Journal of Contemporary History. Vol. 43, 2008, No. 1, pp. 93–104.
 "Hierbei werden zweifellos zig Millionen Menschen verhungern." Die deutsche Wirtschaftsplanung für die besetzte Sowjetunion und ihre Umsetzung 1941–1944. In: Transit: Europäische Revue. No. 38, 2009, pp. 57–77.
  Verhungernlassen als Massenmordstrategie. Das Treffen der deutschen Staatssekretäre am 2. Mai 1941. In: Zeitschrift für Weltgeschichte. Vol. 11, 2010, No. 1, pp. 81–105.
 A "War in a Region beyond State Control"? The German-Soviet War, 1941–1944. In: War in History. Vol. 18, 2011, No. 1, pp. 109–122.
 "The Purpose of the Russian Campaign Is the Decimation of the Slavic Population by Thirty Million": The Radicalization of German Food Policy in Early 1941. In: Alex J. Kay et al. (eds.), Nazi Policy on the Eastern Front, 1941: Total War, Genocide, and Radicalization. University of Rochester Press, Rochester, NY 2012, pp. 101–129.
 Death Threat in the Reichstag, June 13, 1929: Nazi Parliamentary Practice and the Fate of Ernst Heilmann. In: German Studies Review. Vol. 35, 2012, No. 1, pp. 19–32.
 Transition to Genocide, July 1941: Einsatzkommando 9 and the Annihilation of Soviet Jewry. In: Holocaust and Genocide Studies. Vol. 27, 2013, No. 3, pp. 411–442.
 German Economic Plans for the Occupied Soviet Union and their Implementation, 1941–1944. In: Timothy Snyder and Ray Brandon (eds.), Stalin and Europe: Imitation and Domination, 1928–1953. Oxford University Press, New York 2014, pp. 163–189.
 Niemieckie Plany Gospodarcze dla Okupowanych Terenów Związku Sowieckiego i ich Realizacja, 1941–1944. In: Timothy Snyder and Ray Brandon (eds.), Stalin i Europa, 1928–1953, trans. Sławomir Kędzierski. Wydawnictwo Poznańskie, Poznań 2014, .
 Dr. Hanns Martin Schleyer: "Ich bin alter Nationalsozialist und SS-Führer". In: Wolfgang Proske (ed.), Täter Helfer Trittbrettfahrer, Band 6: NS-Belastete aus Südbaden. 2nd revised edition. Kugelberg Verlag, Gerstetten 2017, pp. 301–311.
 Speaking the Unspeakable: The Portrayal of the Wannsee Conference in the Film Conspiracy. In: Holocaust Studies. Vol. 27, 2021, No. 2, pp. 187–200. First published online Open Access, 9 August 2019.
 Crimes of the Wehrmacht: A Re-evaluation. In: Journal of Perpetrator Research. Vol. 3, 2020, No. 1, pp. 95–127.

References

External links 
 Dr. Alex Kay. In: University of Potsdam, Department of History (employee profile).
 Literature by Alex J. Kay in the British Library catalogue.
 Entry in Clio-online Directory of Scholars.

1979 births
Living people
Historians of Nazism
British historians
People from Kingston upon Hull